Stenomordellariodes is a genus of beetles in the family Mordellidae, containing the following species:

 Stenomordellariodes fasciata Ermisch, 1968
 Stenomordellariodes quadrimaculata Ermisch, 1954

References

Mordellidae